Food Paradise International is a television series narrated by Jesse Blaze Snider like its predecessor Food Paradise that features the best places to find various cuisines at food locations, but instead of America, all over the world. Each episode takes the viewer on a culinary quest to discover unique types of restaurants serving up their signature specialties. It's the most unusual foods the continents have to offer; dishes from Asia and Europe to Africa and Australia. New episodes currently air on Wednesdays at 9 p.m. EST on the Travel Channel.

Season 1 (2015)

Pork Paradise

Steak Paradise

Deep Fried Paradise

Burger Paradise

Pizza Paradise

BBQ Paradise

Season 2 (2016)

Seafood Paradise

Hot & Spicy Paradise

Sandwich Paradise

Late Night Paradise

Cheese Paradise

Hot & Spicy Paradise 2

References

External links
Food Paradise International @Travelchannel.com

Travel Channel original programming
American travel television series
2015 American television series debuts